Dzhubga (Adyghe: Жьыбгъэ which means "Wind") is a seaside resort situated 57 km west of Tuapse in Krasnodar Krai, Russia.

Dzhubga is the starting point of the M27 highway. It is connected to the region's capital, Krasnodar, by a  highway that runs northward, passing through Adygeysk and Goryachy Klyuch. This proximity to a major city makes Dzhubga a popular holiday destination.

History 
The township was established in 1864 on the site of a former Shapsug village as the Cossack stanitsa of Dzhubgskaya. It took its name from the Dzhubga River, which enters the Dzhubga Bay of the Black Sea.

In 1904 was built the parochial school. During World War II it was used as a hospital.

In 1905 Dzubga has 74 yards of Russian settlers.

Population 
Population:  Its estimated population as of 2008 was 5,295.

References

Urban-type settlements in Krasnodar Krai
Tuapsinsky District
Black Sea Governorate
Seaside resorts in Russia